Spinodus is a genus of conodonts. A new species, S. wardi, was described from the middle Ordovician of Canada by Svend Stouge in 2012.

Species 
 Spinodus spinatus (Hadding, 1913)
 Spinodus wardi Stouge, 2012

References 

Conodont genera